Steve Bastien  (born March 4, 1994) is an American decathlete.

Bastien is a former student at the University of Michigan where he was a five time All American. He also attended high school at Saline High School in Saline, Michigan. At the 2020 US Olympic Trials held in Eugene, Oregon, Bastien finished second with 8,485 points which qualified him to compete at the 2020 Summer Olympics.

References

External links
 
 Steve Bastien profile Michigan Wolverines track and field
 Steve Bastien (decathlete) profile USATF 
 Steve Bastien (decathlete) profile Team USA
 Michigan Wolverines bio

Living people
1994 births
American male decathletes
Michigan Wolverines men's track and field athletes
People from Saline, Michigan
Athletes (track and field) at the 2020 Summer Olympics
Olympic track and field athletes of the United States
21st-century American people